Tarver is an extinct town in Echols County, in the U.S. state of Georgia. The GNIS classifies it as a populated place.

History
The Georgia General Assembly incorporated Tarver as a town in 1887. The town's municipal charter officially was repealed in 1995.

References

Former municipalities in Georgia (U.S. state)
Geography of Echols County, Georgia
Ghost towns in Georgia (U.S. state)
Populated places disestablished in 1995